Piece of Cake is an album by the American band Mudhoney. Released in 1992, it was their first album for Reprise Records. The album was released at the height of grunge, a genre Mudhoney had helped create.

The album peaked at No. 189 on the Billboard 200. The band supported it with a North American tour that included shows with Eugenius. "Suck You Dry" and "Blinding Sun" were released as singles.

Reprise reissued the album in 2003, bundled with the E.P. Five Dollar Bob's Mock Cooter Stew and the B-sides from the singles.

Production
Recorded at Seattle's Egg Studios, the album was produced by Conrad Uno and the band. Mudhoney spent $15,000 to record it; unlike previous albums, the band completed it at one time, instead of spending non-consecutive weeks in the studio. Reprise granted Mudhoney full artistic freedom in the making of Piece of Cake.

Mudhoney reserved four of the album's tracks for each individual bandmember to do what he saw fit. "Youth Body Expression Explosion" is an instrumental track. The band used an organ on many of the songs. Piece of Cake was the first Mudhoney album that bass player Matt Lukin was satisfied with.

Critical reception

The Toronto Star wrote that the songs "are leavened with hooks and humor, and mostly free of extraneous axework." The Calgary Herald determined that "it takes time to grow on you because [Mudhoney] eschews more over-the-top metal influences in favor of punkish garage-rock glory." The Toronto Sun opined that "the majority of the 13 songs sound artlessly tossed together, as though the group felt a lack of effort, in and of itself, somehow constituted a statement about signing with a big corporation."

The Washington Post concluded: "Where other Seattle bands seem to embrace going under, this one fights back ... Mudhoney is too noisy, too punchy and just plain too contrary to curl up and die." The Indianapolis Star stated that, "in his minor-key yelp, Mark Arm frequently equates love with death ... Some listeners may be reminded of a similar album thematically, X's Under the Big Black Sun."

The Rocky Mountain News listed Piece of Cake as the sixth best album of 1992. Spin included the album on its list of the 20 best records of the year.

Track listing

Original
 "[Untitled 1]" – 0:38
 "No End in Sight" – 3:34
 "Make It Now" – 4:25
 "When in Rome" – 3:55
 "[Untitled 2]" – 0:25
 "Suck You Dry" – 2:34
 "Blinding Sun" – 3:39
 "Thirteenth Floor Opening" – 2:31
 "Youth Body Expression Explosion" – 1:59
 "I'm Spun" – 4:04
 "[Untitled 3]" – 0:40
 "Take Me There" – 3:32
 "Living Wreck" – 3:30
 "Let Me Let You Down" – 3:57
 "[Untitled 4]" – 0:29
 "Ritzville" – 2:38
 "Acetone" – 4:15

Reissue
 "[Untitled 1]" – 0:38
 "No End in Sight" – 3:34
 "Make It Now" – 4:25
 "When in Rome" – 3:55
 "[Untitled 2] – 0:25
 "Suck You Dry" – 2:34
 "Blinding Sun" – 3:39
 "Thirteenth Floor Opening" – 2:31
 "Youth Body Expression Explosion" – 1:59
 "I'm Spun" - 4:04
 "[Untitled 3]" – 0:40
 "Take Me There" – 3:32
 "Living Wreck" – 3:30
 "Let Me Let You Down" – 3:57
 "[Untitled 4]" – 0:29
 "Ritzville" – 2:38
 "Acetone" – 4:15
 "Over the Top" – 2:35 *
 "King Sandbox" – 2:43 **
 "Baby o Baby" – 3:45 **
 "In the Blood" – 3:08 ***
 "No Song III" – 4:11 ***
 "Between Me & You Kid" – 3:38 ***
 "Six Two One" – 2:34 ***
 "Make It Now Again" – 4:35 ***
 "Deception Pass" – 2:54 ***/*/**
 "Underide" – 2:07 ***/*

* originally appeared as a B-Side to "Suck You Dry" (1992)
** originally appeared as a B-Side to "Blinding Sun" (1993)
*** originally appeared on the E.P. Five Dollar Bob's Mock Cooter Stew (1993)

Personnel
Mark Arm - vocals, guitar, organ, slide guitar, piano
Steve Turner - guitar, key bass, harmonica, banjo, vocals
Dan Peters - drums, marimba, vocals
Matt Lukin - bass guitar, vocals

Chart positions

Album

Singles

References

Mudhoney albums
1992 albums
Reprise Records albums
Albums produced by Conrad Uno